The women's 50m freestyle events at the 2020 World Para Swimming European Open Championships were held at the Penteada Olympic Pools Complex.

Medalists

Results

S4
Heats

Final

S5
Final

S6
Final

S7
Heats

Final

S8
Final

S9
Heats

Final

S10
Heat 1

Final

S11
Final

S12
Final

S13
Heat 1

Final

References

2020 World Para Swimming European Championships